Dakota County is the third-most populous county in the U.S. state of Minnesota, located in the east central portion of the state. As of the 2020 census, the population was 439,882. The population of Dakota County was estimated to be 442,038 in 2021. The county seat is Hastings. Dakota County is named for the Dakota Sioux tribal bands who inhabited the area. The name is recorded as "Dahkotah" in the United States Census records until 1851. Dakota County is included in the Minneapolis–St. Paul–Bloomington, MN–WI Metropolitan Statistical Area, the sixteenth largest metropolitan area in the United States with about 3.64 million residents. The largest city in Dakota County is the city of Lakeville, the eleventh-largest city in Minnesota and sixth-largest Twin Cities suburb. The county is bordered by the Minnesota and Mississippi Rivers on the north, and the state of Wisconsin on the east.

History
The county was the site of historical events at Mendota that defined the state's future, including providing materials for the construction of Fort Snelling across the river and the signing of the Treaty of Traverse des Sioux which ceded land from the native Dakota nation for the Minnesota Territory. The county's history was initially tied to the confluence of the Mississippi and Minnesota Rivers, both strategically important for United States expansion and as the convergence of the Dakota and Ojibwe nations who regarded the site as sacred. Influence shifted westward during the post-World War II settlement boom when Interstate 35 connected the western half of the county to Minneapolis and Saint Paul and bedroom communities grew. Most work outside the county but like many metro counties, Dakota continues to absorb industry and jobs from the core cities.

In the 1600s, Mdewakanton Dakota fled their ancestral home of Mille Lacs Lake in northern Minnesota in response to westward expansion of the Ojibwe nation. According to Dakota tradition, their ancestors pushed out the Iowa who were found settled at the mouth of the Minnesota River. In 1680, the Mdewakanton Dakota were contacted by French explorer Daniel Greysolon, Sieur du Lhut, and the Mendota (mdo-TE) band of the Mdewakanton south of the Minnesota River were contacted by Joseph Nicollet in the 18th century. While Taoyateduta (a.k.a. Little Crow) led the Mendota in northern Dakota County, upstream to the southwest, Chief Black Dog established his village of 600 people around 1750 at the isthmus between Black Dog Lake (which is named after him) and the Minnesota River, near the present site of the Black Dog Power Plant.

Following the published expeditions of explorers, in 1805, Zebulon Pike negotiated for military territory with the Mendota band which included land in Dakota County at the Mississippi River confluences with the Minnesota and St. Croix Rivers. In 1819, on what is now Picnic Island on the south bank of the Minnesota River, Colonel Henry Leavenworth built a stockade fort called "St. Peter's Cantonment" or "New Hope," where materials were assembled for the construction of Fort Snelling to be built on the bluff on the north bank. Permanent settlement on the island was impossible due to annual flooding. Alexis Bailey built some log buildings nearby to trade in furs in 1826. Henry Hastings Sibley later built the first stone house in Minnesota in 1836, overlooking Fort Snelling. Sibley was a partner in the American Fur Company, and considerable fur trade occurred at Mendota due to the accessibility of the confluence.

Ongoing United States expansion into the then "Northwest Territory" led to government purchase of land from the Dakota people (the Mdewakanton, Wahpekute, Wahpeton, and Sisseton bands) via the Treaty of St. Peters, the Treaty of Traverse des Sioux, and the Treaty of Mendota in 1851. After the Minnesota Territory was established in 1849, Dakotah County (later Dakota County) spanned from the Mississippi River to the Missouri River.
By the time Minnesota achieved statehood in 1858, power and influence had shifted from Mendota, across the rivers to Saint Paul and Minneapolis.

Hastings and South St. Paul
By 1900, the hub of activity in the county was in Hastings, the county seat, and a focal point of transportation, communication, and commerce. St. Peter's, now Mendota, had lost out to Fort Snelling. Hastings is located on the Mississippi River at the confluence of the St. Croix River and on the Vermillion River, which provided ample water power. Lumber, milling, and railroads provided good incomes. During this time, the stockyards and meat-packing plants in South St. Paul, Minnesota became the world's largest stockyards. Ranchers in the west shipped their livestock to St. Louis, Memphis, and New Orleans. These plants were worked by immigrants from Romania, Serbia, and other Eastern European countries. The rest of the county remained agricultural during the boom of milling activity north of the Minnesota River due to lack of bridge connections. Rail access came in 1866 via the Chicago, St. Paul, Minneapolis, and Omaha Railroad which shipped grain to millers. The Minneapolis St. Paul Rochester and Dubuque Electric Traction Company line in 1905 (now the Dan Patch Corridor), was primary for passengers going to resorts in Burnsville and Lakeville.

Suburban growth
By the 1950s, population growth shifted to western Dakota county, which had been predominantly Irish and Scottish extending southward toward the Scandinavians of Southern Minnesota. As population pressures expanded south from Minneapolis and Bloomington, the completion of Interstate 35W and 35E brought about major construction in the post-World War II period, turning villages into cities within 20 years. Burnsville, Apple Valley, Eagan, and Lakeville brought over 200,000 people into the county by the end of the century. The Western and Northern Service Centers were constructed in the early 1990s each with an additional courthouse location. License centers were subsequently set up in Burnsville and Lakeville. Though pressure remained since the postwar boom to move the county seat to a larger community, the Dakota County Board maintained the seat in Hastings, while providing government services across the county.

Historic sites
The history of the county is well-illustrated by the Registered Historic Places in the county, including the settlement at Mendota, the homes of well-heeled residents of Hastings, the ethnic gathering places in South Saint Paul, and other sites related to life on the prairie, including religion, education, transportation, commerce, and farm life.

Law and government
Dakota County is governed by the Board of Commissioners. The members of the Board as of March 1, 2017 are:

 Mike Slavik, District 1
 Kathleen Gaylord, District 2
 Thomas Egan, District 3
 Joe Atkins, District 4
 Liz Workman, District 5
 Mary Liz Holberg, District 6
 Chris Gerlach, District 7

Dakota County has an elected Sheriff (Tim Leslie) and an elected County Attorney (James Backstrom). There are appointed boards for the library system, community development agency, and several advisory boards. Dakota County is served by an elected board of the Soil and Water Conservation District.

Politics
Dakota County voters tend to vote Democratic. Since 1960, the county has selected the Democratic Party candidate in 71% of national elections (as of 2020).

Geography
The county terrain consists of low rolling hills, sloping to the river valleys. Its highest point is at Buck Hill in Burnsville, at 1,168 feet. ASL.

Rivers

The northern and eastern boundaries of Dakota County are marked by the Minnesota and Mississippi Rivers. Management and jurisdiction of the rivers falls into multiple local, State and Federal agencies. Most of the Minnesota River bank is under the Minnesota Valley National Wildlife Refuge with fish, wildlife, and parkland managed collectively by the United States Fish and Wildlife Service and the Minnesota Department of Natural Resources. The Dakota County Soil and Water Conservation District assists the county's six watershed management organizations (WMO) which include the Black Dog WMO, Gun Club Lake WMO, Lower Minnesota River Watershed District, Lower Mississippi WMO, North Cannon River WMO,  and the Vermillion River Watershed Joint Powers Organization.
 Mississippi River: Adjacent to Mendota Heights, Lilydale, South St. Paul, Inver Grove Heights, Rosemount, and Hastings.
 Minnesota River: Adjacent to Burnsville, Eagan, Mendota Heights, and Mendota.
 Vermillion River: From Farmington through Empire Township to Hastings.
 Cannon River: Adjacent to Randolph and through Randolph Township.

Lakes

Major highways

  Interstate 35
  Interstate 35E
  Interstate 35W
  Interstate 494
  US Highway 52
  US Highway 61
  Minnesota State Highway 3
  Minnesota State Highway 13
  Minnesota State Highway 19
  Minnesota State Highway 20
  Minnesota State Highway 50
  Minnesota State Highway 55
  Minnesota State Highway 56
  Minnesota State Highway 62
  Minnesota State Highway 77
  Minnesota State Highway 149
  Minnesota State Highway 156
  Minnesota State Highway 316
  County Road 42
  County Road 23
 Other County Roads

Adjacent counties

 Ramsey County - north
 Washington County - northeast
 Pierce County, Wisconsin - east
 Goodhue County - southeast
 Rice County - southwest
 Scott County - west
 Hennepin County - northwest

Protected areas
The following protected areas are within or partially within Dakota County:

 Chub Lake Wildlife Management Area
 Fort Snelling State Park (part)
 Hastings Sand Coulee Scientific and Natural Area
 Miesville Ravine Park Reserve (part)
 Minnesota Valley National Wildlife Refuge (part)
 Mississippi National River and Recreation Area (part)
 Murphy-Hanrehan Park Reserve (part)
 National Wildlife Refuge, Bloomington (part)
 Spring Lake Regional Park & Park Reserve
 Vermillion Highlands
 Whitetail Woods Regional Park

Parks
The following parks are located within Dakota County:

 Big Rivers Regional Trail
 Dakota County Bikeway System
 Dakota Woods Dog Park
 Lake Byllesby Regional Park
 Lebanon Hills Regional Park
 Thompson County Park

Economy
Since the county grew as a bedroom community of Minneapolis and Saint Paul, over half of the residents (54%) work outside the county.

Demographics

2020 census

Note: the US Census treats Hispanic/Latino as an ethnic category. This table excludes Latinos from the racial categories and assigns them to a separate category. Hispanics/Latinos can be of any race.

2010 census
According to the 2010 census, Dakota County had a population of 398,552, of which 195,661 (49.1%) were male and 202,891 (50.9%) were female. In terms of age, 76.7% of the population were 16 years and over, 73.6% were 18 years and over, 70.5% were 21 years and over, 12.8% were 62 years and over, and 10.0% were 65 years and over. The median age was 36.8 years. The median age for males was 35.7; the median age for females was 37.9.

In terms of race and ethnicity, the county was 85.2% White (82.3% Non-Hispanic White), 4.7% Black or African American, 0.4% American Indian and Alaska Native, 4.4% Asian, 0.1% Native Hawaiian and Other Pacific Islander, 2.4% from some other race, and 2.9% from two or more races. Hispanics and Latinos of any race made up 6.0% of the population.

In terms of households, 69.5% were family households and 30.5% were non-family households. Approximately 55.2% were husband-wife family households; 26% had children under 18 years of age. Approximately 36.6% of households had children under 18 years of age living in them; 18.6% had people over the age of 65 living in them. The average household size was 2.60 and the average family size was 3.12. In terms of housing occupancy, 95.3% of households were occupied and 4.7% were vacant. Of the vacant housing units, 2.0% were for rent, 0.1% were rented but not occupied, 1.2% were for sale only, 0.2% were sold but not occupied, 0.5% were for seasonal, recreational, or occasional use, and 0.8% were all other vacants. The homeowner vacancy rate was 1.7% and the rental vacancy rate was 8.1%. Of all occupied housing units, 76.5% were owner-occupied and 23.5% were renter-occupied. The population in owner-occupied units was 314,833; the average household size was 2.71. The population in renter-occupied units was 80,866; the average household size was 2.26.

Education
Dakota County is home to the state's largest school districts and some of the highest paid Superintendents. Nationally recognized Independent School District 196 (Rosemount-Apple Valley-Eagan) houses 28,000 and is the fourth largest school district in the state. Other districts include Independent School District 191 (Burnsville–Eagan–Savage School District), Independent School District 194 (Lakeville–Elko–New Market), Independent School District 197 (West St. Paul–Mendota Heights–Eagan) and Independent School District 200 (Hastings).

Schools

High school
 Apple Valley High School (ISD 196)
 Burnsville Senior High School (ISD 191)
 Burnsville Alternative High School (ISD 191)
 Eagan High School (ISD 196)
 Eastview High School (ISD 196)
 Farmington Senior High School (ISD 192)
 Hastings Area Alternative School & Learning Center (ISD 200)
 Hastings High School (ISD 200)
 Two Rivers High School (ISD 197)
 Lakeville North High School (ISD 194)
 Lakeville South High School (ISD 194)
 Rosemount High School (ISD 196)
 School of Environmental Studies (ISD 196)
 Simley High School (ISD 199)
 South Saint Paul High School (SSD 6)

Junior high school
 Black Hawk Middle School (ISD 196)
 Boeckman Middle School (ISD 192)
 Century Middle School (ISD 194)
 Dakota Hills Middle (ISD 196)
 Dodge Middle School (ISD 192)
 Friendly Hills Middle School (ISD 197)
 Gateway Academy (ISD 192)
 Hastings Middle School (ISD 200)
 Heritage E-STEM Magnet School (ISD 197)
 John Metcalf Junior High School (ISD 191)
 Joseph Nicollet Junior High School (ISD 191)
 Kenwood Trail Middle School (ISD 194)
 Levi P. Dodge Middle School (ISD 192)
 McGuire Middle School (ISD 194)
 Robert Boeckman Middle School (ISD 192)
 Rosemount Middle School (ISD 196)
 Scott Highlands Middle School (ISD 196)
 South Saint Paul Secondary (SSD 6)
 Valley Middle School (ISD 196)

Elementary school
 Akin Road Elementary (ISD 192)
 Cedar Park Elementary School (ISD 196)
 Cherry View Elementary School (ISD 194)
 Christa McAuliffe Elementary (ISD 200)
 Christina Huddleston Elementary School (ISD 194)
 Cooper Elementary (ISD 200)
 Deerwood Elementary (ISD 196)
 Diamond Path Elementary (ISD 196)
 East Lake Elementary (ISD 196)
 Eastview Elementary School  (ISD 194)
 Echo Park Elementary (ISD 196)
 Edward D. Neill Elementary (ISD 191)
 Farmington Elementary (ISD 192)
 Garlough Environmental Magnet School (ISD 197)
 Gideon Pond Elementary (ISD 191)
 Glacier Hills Elementary (ISD 196)
 Greenleaf Elementary (ISD 196)
 Highland Elementary (ISD 196)
 John F. Kennedy Elementary (ISD 194)
 Kaposia Education Center (SSD 6)
 Lake Marion Elementary School (ISD 194)
 Lakeview Elementary School (ISD 194)
 Lincoln Center Elementary (SSD 6)
 Meadowview Elementary (ISD 192)
 Mendota Elementary School (ISD 197)
 Moreland Arts & Health Sciences Magnet School (ISD 197)
 North Trail Elementary (ISD 192)
 Northview Elementary (ISD 196)
 Oak Hills Elementary School (ISD 194)
 Oak Ridge Elementary (ISD 196)
 Orchard Lake Elementary (ISD 194)
 Parkview Elementary (ISD 196)
 Pilot Knob STEM Magnet School (ISD 197)
 Pinecrest Elementary (ISD 200)
 Pinewood Elementary (ISD 196)
 Rahn Elementary (ISD 191)
 Red Pine Elementary (ISD 196)
 Riverview Elementary (ISD 192)
 Rosemount Elementary (ISD 196)
 Shannon Park (ISD 196)
 Sioux Trail Elementary (ISD 191)
 Sky Oaks Elementary (ISD 191)
 Somerset Elementary School (ISD 197)
 Southview Elementary (ISD 196)
 Thomas Lake Elementary (ISD 196)
 Tilden Elementary (ISD 200)
 Vista View Elementary (ISD 191)
 William Byrne Elementary (ISD 191)
 Westview Elementary (ISD 196)
 Woodland Elementary (ISD 196)

Other schools
 Saint Joseph Catholic School (pre-kindergarten–8th grade)
 St. Croix Lutheran High School and Middle School
 Holy Trinity Catholic School (pre-kindergarten–8th grade)
 Faithful Shepherd Catholic School (pre-kindergarten-8th grade)

Colleges and universities
 Dakota County Technical College
 Inver Hills Community College

Libraries

 Burnhaven Library in Burnsville
 Farmington Library in Farmington
 Galaxie Library in Apple Valley
 Heritage Library in Lakeville
 Inver Glen Library in Inver Grove Heights
 Pleasant Hill Library in Hastings
 Robert Trail Library in Rosemount
 City of South St. Paul Library in South St. Paul
 Wentworth Library in West St. Paul
 Wescott Library in Eagan

Communities

Dakota County is home to sites significant in the state's early history. At Mendota, the Treaty of Mendota was signed, opening Southern Minnesota to settlement, and prominent Saint Paul businessmen built their mansions there. Though linked with the state's capital for much of history via rail, Dakota County owes much of its current growth to the expansion of Minneapolis' population which accelerated during the post-World War II boom era of the 1960s. This demand for housing along with two major interstate highways linking Minneapolis (I-35W) and St. Paul (I-35E) to the county, concentrated major growth and demand along the northern end. Today, the cities of Burnsville, Eagan, Apple Valley, Lakeville, Rosemount, Hastings, Inver Grove Heights, Mendota Heights, West St. Paul, and South St. Paul are synonymous with the Twin Cities, as being part of "the Cities." Both Burnsville and Eagan are nearly developed and have become more like independent cities attracting major development than mere residential bedroom suburbs.

In contrast, the southern part of Dakota County reflects the rural past with small towns such as Farmington, Coates, Vermillion, Hampton, Randolph, and Miesville where street grids and housing dating from the early 20th century can be found. Much of the county is self-contained except for two examples. The City of Hastings, the county seat, lies on both banks of the Mississippi River and was linked historically and physically by rail to the growing influence of the state's capital, Saint Paul. On the south border, the City of Northfield, technically in Rice County, has expanded north into Dakota however the city itself is allowed into the municipal sewer boundary.

Though all of Dakota County is considered part of the metropolitan area and open to major development, the county government has steadily preserved farmland and continues to acquire new permanent natural lands in the southern townships. This has further defined the boundaries between urbanized and rural which is starkly visible in the outskirts of the developed cities. While the center of population still lies north with more cosmopolitan residents, culturally Dakota County is a rural community and the Dakota County Fair is still a largely agricultural event, held annually in Farmington.

Most of northern Dakota County is referred to as "South of the River" for its location being south of the Minnesota River.

Cities (2020 population estimate)

 Apple Valley 55,059
 Burnsville 61,461
 Coates 161
 Eagan 67,097
 Farmington 23,901
 Hampton 689
 Hastings (partly in Washington County) 22,849
 Inver Grove Heights 36,025
 Lakeville 69,295
 Lilydale 623
 Mendota 198
 Mendota Heights 11,492
 Miesville 125
 New Trier 112
 Northfield (mostly in Rice County) 20,774 
 Randolph 436
 Rosemount 25,441
 South St. Paul 20,165
 Sunfish Lake 521
 Vermillion 419
 West St. Paul 19,738

Unincorporated communities

 Castle Rock
 Etter
 Eureka Center
 Waterford
 Rosemount

Ghost towns
 Lewiston
 Nininger

Townships

 Castle Rock Township
 Douglas Township
 Empire Township
 Eureka Township
 Greenvale Township
 Hampton Township
 Marshan Township
 Nininger Township
 Randolph Township
 Ravenna Township
 Sciota Township
 Vermillion Township
 Waterford Township

Notable people

 Pierce Butler, United States Supreme Court justice
 Ignatius Donnelly, politician
 Steven Engler, politician
 David Knutson, Minnesota State Senator of District 37, 2003-2004
 William Gates LeDuc, pioneer, politician, brevet brigadier general
 Henry Hastings Sibley, first Governor of Minnesota
 Harold Stassen (R), Former Governor of Minnesota, Aide to Adm. Bull Halsey, Aide to President Dwight Eisenhower, Participant/Drafter of the United Nations Charter

See also
 National Register of Historic Places listings in Dakota County, Minnesota

References

External links

 Dakota County Historical Society
 Dakota County government's website
 Dakota County Library's website
 Dakota County Parks
 Dakota County Community Development Agency
 Dakota County Biographies from 1881
 Dakota County Sheriff's Office

 
Minneapolis–Saint Paul
Minnesota counties
Minnesota counties on the Mississippi River
Minnesota placenames of Native American origin
1849 establishments in Minnesota Territory
Populated places established in 1849